The Cyclo-cross Fayetteville is a cyclo-cross race held in Fayetteville, Arkansas in the United States, which is since 2021 part of the UCI Cyclo-cross World Cup.

Past winners

Men

Women

References
 Results

UCI Cyclo-cross World Cup
Cycle races in the United States
Cyclo-cross races